Dynasty Wars, released in Japan as , is a 1989 side-scrolling beat-'em-up game released for arcades by Capcom, based on the Japanese manga Tenchi wo Kurau and a reenactment of the battle between the Kingdom of Shu and the Yellow Turban rebels. Each of the two players can assume the roles of one of the four Chinese generals riding on horseback from the Three Kingdoms period in an attempt to smash the rebellion. A sequel, Warriors of Fate, was released in 1992.

Gameplay
The players' goal is to wipe out the Huang Ching, the organization responsible for the unrest of the Han Dynasty and later defeat the tyrant Dong Zhuo, and up to two players can fight side by side to accomplish this goal. This game always scrolls to the right. Players must be able to survive the rebel hordes to reach and kill the rebel general in each stage to free the province.

Players can use three buttons: to attack left, attack right, or use special tactics. In the arcade version, inserting more coins and pressing START increases the maximum life of the player. In an RPG style, completing stages and collecting yellow orbs increase the experience points of the player in order to level-up, where he gains more vitality and use stronger weapons. These weapons are upgraded for every 3rd blue orb collected. In-game treasure increases player score, and food packs replenish vitality.

There are 4 selectable characters, each with their own varying amounts of attack power and initial vitality. Aside from unique weaponry, each character also has a unique partner character during a certain special attack. For every 3 blue orbs collected, the player's weapon improves, depending on his current level range.

There are a total of eight stages (called rounds), corresponding a province in reference to the historic battles in the novel.

Conversions
Home computer versions for the ZX Spectrum, Amstrad CPC and Commodore 64 were developed by Tiertex and published by U.S. Gold in 1990.

NEC Avenue produced a PC Engine Super CD-ROM² version of Tenchi o Kurau, which was released exclusively in Japan in 1994. It adds an extensive intro and in-game cut scenes.

A version for the Capcom Power System Changer was planned and previewed but never released.

A completely different game based on the manga and made by Capcom was released on the NES as Destiny of an Emperor in North America.

Reception

In Japan, Game Machine listed Dynasty Wars on their May 15, 1989 issue as being the second most-successful table arcade unit of the month, outperforming titles like Crack Down and Valkyrie no Densetsu.

The ZX Spectrum version was received with mixed reviews; Your Sinclair awarded it 80%, highlighting the detailed graphics and horse-mounted theme of combat. CRASH rated it only 44%, criticizing the monochrome graphics, juddering scrolling and dull gameplay.

References

1989 video games
Amiga games
Amstrad CPC games
Arcade video games
Atari ST games
Cancelled Capcom Power System Changer games
Capcom beat 'em ups
Cooperative video games
Commodore 64 games
CP System games
TurboGrafx-CD games
Video games based on anime and manga
Video games based on Romance of the Three Kingdoms
Video games developed in Japan
Video games scored by Manami Matsumae
ZX Spectrum games
Side-scrolling beat 'em ups
Tiertex Design Studios games
Multiplayer and single-player video games
U.S. Gold games